The Université Libre de Kinshasa (French; , known as ULK) is a private university in Kinshasa, Democratic Republic of the Congo.

It was established on 15 October 1988. It was the first private secular university in the DRC.

Alumni
Debora Kayembe

References

External links

 Université Libre de Kinshasa 

Universities in Kinshasa
Education in Kinshasa
Universities in the Democratic Republic of the Congo
Educational institutions established in 1988
1988 establishments in Zaire